The Lot Crocker House is a historic house in Barnstable, Massachusetts.  The -story wood frame Cape style house was built c. 1800.  It is five bays wide, with a side gable roof and twin interior chimneys, an unusual feature of houses of the period, which more typically have a central chimney.  It has a center entry that is topped by a transom window.  Lot Crocker, member of a locally prominent family, lived in this house in the mid-19th century and operated a nearby salt works.

The house was listed on the National Register of Historic Places in 1987.

See also
National Register of Historic Places listings in Barnstable County, Massachusetts

References

Houses in Barnstable, Massachusetts
National Register of Historic Places in Barnstable, Massachusetts
Houses on the National Register of Historic Places in Barnstable County, Massachusetts
Federal architecture in Massachusetts